Abdelkrim Zbidi (born 25 June 1950 in Rejiche) is a Tunisian politician.

Biography 

He holds a doctorate of medicine from the University Claude Bernard of Lyon, a master's degree in human physiology and functional exploitations, a master's degree in human pharmacology, a diploma of advanced studies in human physiology and a degree in studies and research in human biology.

He became coordinator of the training of senior health technicians at the faculty of medicine of Sousse between 1981 and 1988; He also held several positions at the Faculty: Head of the Department of Basic Sciences from 1982 to 1989 and Professor of Hospital and University from 1987. He is also Head of Department of Functional Investigations at Farhat-Hached Hospital in Sousse between 1990 and 1999.

He is responsible from 1992 for missions of expertise in the field of medical applications of the nuclear power at the International Atomic Energy Agency.

He chairs the College of Physiology and Functional Explorations, between 1994 and 1997, reporting to the Ministry of Public Health and Central University from 1995 to 1999; he is also dean of the faculty of medicine of Sousse between 2005 and 2008.

Political career
During the reshuffle of 27 January 2011 of Prime Minister Mohamed Ghannouchi, he became minister of national defence.  He replaced Ridha Grira who held the office only for ten days.

See also 
Government Mohamed Ghannouchi

References 

1950 births
Living people
People from Mahdia Governorate
Health ministers of Tunisia
People of the Tunisian Revolution
Defence ministers of Tunisia